My Life II... The Journey Continues (Act 1) is the tenth studio album by American singer and songwriter Mary J. Blige, released on November 21, 2011, by Geffen Records and Matriarch Records. Titled as the sequel and serving as a  thematic extension to her 1994 breakthrough album My Life, which portrayed a dark period in Blige's personal life, it talks about the themes of struggle, heartbreak, and strength while reflecting the growth and evolution she had experienced since the release of its predecessor.

Production for the album took place during 2010 to 2011 at several recording studios in New York City and Los Angeles and was handled by Danja, Eric Hudson, Rodney Jerkins, Jim Jonsin, Rico Love, Harmony Samuels, Stargate, Tricky Stewart, The Underdogs, and Jerry Wonda. Upon its release, My Life II received generally positive reviews from music critics. The album debuted at number five on the US Billboard 200 chart with first week sales of 156,000 copies. It was certified gold by the Recording Industry Association of America (RIAA).

Background
In December 2009, Blige's ninth studio album, Stronger with Each Tear, was released, debuting at number two on the Billboard 200 and at number one on the Top R&B/Hip-Hop Albums chart, selling 332,000 units in its first week of release. It became her ninth consecutive studio album to have debuted at the top of the US Top R&B/Hip-Hop Albums chart and won Blige the award for Outstanding Female Artist and Outstanding Album at the 41st NAACP Image Awards. By August 2010, Blige had already begun work on her tenth studio album with Swizz Beatz, Kanye West, The Underdogs, Jerry Wonda, Arden Altino, Lil Ronnie, Jay-Z, Timbaland, Salaam Remi, Maxwell, Alicia Keys, Raphael Saadiq, Ester Dean, J.U.S.T.I.C.E. League, Johnta Austin, Eric Hudson, Q-Tip, Sean Garrett, DJ Premier, Gorilla Tek, Don Pooh, Ne-Yo, and Drumma Boy. Blige revealed during her Music Saved My Life Tour, that she was in no rush to release the album and she had not given it a title yet. A song called "Anything You Want" featuring Busta Rhymes and Gyptian leaked on line in August 2010.

Backstage at the 2010 MTV Video Music Awards, when speaking of approach to the new album, Blige described crafting sonic heat similar to her first two studio albums but plan to update the vintage Blige sound, telling that “[it will be] more like a What's the 411? of 2012. It's headed [in] that direction but in a new [way]. Not what it used to be. Right now, it's going in the Mary direction, which is R&B and hip-hop and soul. If it goes into the club direction, it will probably be more soulful than futuristic." On June 21, 2011, a track titled "Feel Inside" apparently featuring Nicki Minaj leaked online. In an interview with MTV it was revealed that the track was in fact two separate songs that the duo were respectively working on, but that someone had put together. Blige revealed that despite the fake collaboration, Minaj and Blige would be collaborating on a song. "I was ****ed about the leaking of the Nicki Minaj and Mary J Blige record, because that's not fair and people shouldn't do that [...] But I'm over it. We move on. We're going to make more hot music."

In terms of what she wanted to achieve musically with the album, Blige herself told Blues & Soul: "With so much techno and four-to-the floor and general loss of live instrumentation going on today, to me people are not doing real MUSIC any more. And so with this album I really wanted people to remember when music was about QUALITY instead of QUANTITY!... I basically wanted to separate myself and give everybody back what I feel music today is MISSING." Finished in Los Angeles, New York City and Atlanta, My Life II sees Blige looking toward the future while acknowledging the past: "From me to you, My Life II… Our journey together continues in this life,” explained Mary. “It’s a gift to be able to relate and identify with my fans at all times. This album is a reflection of the times and lives of people all around me.”

Release and promotion
Originally scheduled for a September 20, 2011 release, the album was later pushed back to November 21, 2011. A deluxe edition for the album will also be available only in the United States.

Live performances
Mary J. Blige embarked on promotional tours and live performances for My Life II... The Journey Continues (Act 1) and its accompanying singles through the United Kingdom and North America. Promotion began with a live performance of the album's lead single on September 1, 2011, at Good Morning America. Blige performed "25/8" on Dancing with the Stars (October 4). On October 20, Blige debuted a new song from the album called, "Need Someone", at Perez Hilton's "One Night In… New York City" benefit concert for GLSN. Blige also performed "Need Someone" on Later... with Jools Holland (November 1). Blige was a guest on the UK morning show, Daybreak (November 2) and Alan Carr: Chatty Man (November 6) to discuss the new album and single.

Throughout the month of November, Blige performed at numerous shows, including Black Girls Rock! (November 6), the TeenNick HALO Awards (November 6), the American Music Awards (November 20), Macy's Thanksgiving Day Parade (November 24), The Today Show (November 25), Chelsea Lately (November 25), CBS News Sunday Morning (November 27) and The View (November 29). In addition to this, Blige will also embark on a U.S. tour to promote the album. On the tour Blige will perform the original My Life album in its entirety, with shows in Oakland (November 11), Los Angeles (November 17), New York City (November 23) and Atlanta (November 25). The Los Angeles date will be shown live on Vevo November 17, 2011 at 11PM EST. The concert event Mary J. Blige: Unstaged was directed by Adam Shankman.

HSN and Blige aired a special My Life Concert on November 30. In addition to this, Blige sold her perfume, My Life Blossom, during the special. Fans had the chance to purchase the limited-edition My Life Blossom Holiday Gift Se,t including the My Life Blossom Eau de Parfum and Body Cream plus the HSN-Exclusive My Life II...The Journey Continues (Act 1) album.

Blige performed "Need Someone" along with "Family Affair" at the ninth annual WWE Tribute to the Troops that aired on December 13, 2011, on the USA Network and December 17, 2011, on NBC.

On December 19, 2011, Blige performed at "VH1 Divas Celebrates Soul". Blige also be performed on CBS' annual Home for the Holidays which aired December 21.

On February 2, 2012, Blige performed "Mr Wrong", and "The Living Proof" on The Wendy Williams Show.

Singles
"25/8" was released for digital download on September 1, 2011, as the album's first single. The song was produced, and co-written by Eric Hudson. Blige performed the song live for the first time at Good Morning America on September 2, 2011. The song debuted on the Hot R&B/Hip Hop Songs chart at number ninety-four, and has since peaked at number thirty-five. "Mr. Wrong", featuring Drake, was released as the second single from the album on October 28, 2011. The song is co-produced by Jim Jonsin and Rico Love. "Mr. Wrong" impacted Urban radio on November 8, 2011. "Why" featuring Rick Ross and "Don't Mind" were chosen as the next singles from the album. The music videos for "Why" and "Don't Mind" were filmed in March 2012. Mary performed "Why" for the first time on American Idol on March 8, 2012. The instrumental of "Don't Mind" is featured in Blige's ad for "Burger King".

Other songs
"Someone to Love Me (Naked)" was released as first promotional single of the album in March 2011. It is a reworked version of the song "Someone to Love Me" by Diddy – Dirty Money from their album Last Train to Paris and features Lil Wayne, and Diddy. Produced by Jerry "Wonder" Duplessis, and Arden Altino, "Someone to Love Me (Naked)" samples "You Roam When You Don’t Get It At Home" performed by The Sweet Inspirations. A music video for the song was premiered online on April 4, 2011. Blige, and Wayne performed the song live for the first time at the 2011 Billboard Music Awards on May 22, 2011. The song initially debuted on the Hot R&B/Hip Hop Songs chart at number ninety-nine before falling off, only to return, and subsequently peak at number twenty-eight. "The Living Proof" hit the internet on July 5, 2011. It serves as the official soundtrack for "The Help", and is produced by The Underdogs. A music video for the song was released online on August 10, 2011. The song debuted on Billboard's Adult Contemporary chart at number twenty-seven on November 3, 2011. The Chaka Khan remake, "Ain't Nobody", debuted on the Swiss Top 75 Singles chart at number 55.

Critical reception

My Life II... The Journey Continues (Act 1) received generally positive reviews from music critics. At Metacritic, which assigns a normalized rating out of 100 to reviews from mainstream critics, the album received an average score of 72, based on 15 reviews, which indicates "generally favorable reviews". Martyn Young of musicOMH called it "a wonderfully assured collection of classy RnB pop that can justifiably rank amongst her best work", and commented that its ballads "are never grandiose or overblown and Blige’s perfectly poised vocals are genuinely affecting." BBC Music's Lloyd Bradley dubbed the album "Blige's most enjoyable, exciting and consistent album in years" and complimented its music as a "clever updating" of her past hip hop soul. The Daily Telegraph stated, "with the right collaborators [Blige] can conjure golden moments when the listener is transported simultaneously to the church pew and the dancefloor." Rolling Stone writer Jody Rosen called Blige "admirably unfashionable, staying in her sweet spot of midtempo hip-hop soul", adding that "she can still make pain pleasurable."

However, Andy Gill of The Independent was ambivalent towards its "bumpy emotional terrain", adding that "by the time she's berating some partner for not listening to her, your sympathies wane." Kevin Ritchie of NOW panned the album's "easy-listening ballads" and characterized Blige's direction as "dull and predictable". Entertainment Weeklys Adam Markovitz commented that "Blige can still rip your heart out with a note", but criticized "the lovelorn lyrics" and "'modern' touches". Rebecca Nicholson of The Guardian called it "a surprisingly robust return to form [...] elegant, refined and, for the most, part up-to-date", but also found it "far too long" and criticized the "listlessness and sentimentality" of its ballads. Slant Magazine's Eric Henderson disliked Blige's "lapses into self-pity", but commended the "slow burn" of the album's second half as "her most credible adult-contemporary music since 1999's Mary." Allmusic editor Andy Kellman stated, "Those who are hoping for something in the spirit of mid-'90s Blige might be disappointed and think of the title as a ploy, but those who expect a wide variety of material in terms of style and mood will get precisely that."

Los Angeles Times writer Mikael Wood stated, "She gets away with the dramatics because she makes them so easy to buy: No working soul singer depicts struggle (and its hard-won defeat) more believably than Blige does, even when armed with so-so material, as she often is here." Although he found its ballads "a little toothless", Evan Rytlewski of The A.V. Club stated, "What My Life II lacks in a single vision, though, it makes up for with consistently rousing performances from Blige, whose radiant voice has only grown fuller and bluesier with time." Peter S. Scholtes of Spin complimented the "funky, mid-tempo beauties such as 'Irreversible,' 'Midnight Drive,' and 'Someone to Love Me (Naked)'" and stated, "Amid overwrought theatrical gestures, MJB still finds a slinky groove". David Masciotra of PopMatters commented that "despite its flaws, [it] is an immensely enjoyable and impressive album", commending its "four song, mid-album set of soulful R&B" and "closing trio of ballads".

Commercial performance
My Life II... The Journey Continues (Act 1) debuted at number five on the US Billboard 200, with first-week sales of 156,000 copies. In its second week, the album dropped to number six on the chart, selling an additional 72,000 copies. On March 19, 2012, the album was certified gold by the Recording Industry Association of America (RIAA) for sales of over 500,000 copies. As of March 2012, the album has sold 763,200 copies in the United States.

Track listing

Notes
  denotes co-producer
  denotes additional producer
 "Feel Inside" contains elements of "Triumph" (1997) as performed by Wu-Tang Clan.
 "Someone to Love Me (Naked)" contains elements of "You Roam When You Don’t Get It At Home" (1968) as performed by The Sweet Inspirations.

Charts

Weekly charts

Year-end charts

Certifications

Release history

References

External links 
 
 My Life II... The Journey Continues (Act 1) at Metacritic

2011 albums
Albums produced by Danja (record producer)
Albums produced by Eric Hudson
Albums produced by Jim Jonsin
Albums produced by Stargate
Albums produced by Sean Garrett
Albums produced by Rico Love
Albums produced by Rodney Jerkins
Mary J. Blige albums
Interscope Geffen A&M Records albums
Sequel albums
Albums produced by Jerry Duplessis
Albums produced by Calvin Harris
Albums produced by Tricky Stewart
Albums produced by the Underdogs (production team)
Albums produced by Harmony Samuels